Virgin Mobile KSA is a telecommunication company operating in the Kingdom of Saudi Arabia.

The company behind Virgin Mobile Saudi Arabia was formally called the Virgin Mobile Saudi Consortium — a Saudi Arabian company that brings together local, regional and global shareholders and experts in mobile telecommunications.

The company is headquartered in Riyadh and has outlets across the kingdom and a member care centre in Jeddah.

History 
Virgin Mobile Saudi Arabia was awarded a licence by the Communications and Information Technology Commission to operate as a Mobile Virtual Network Operator in April 2014.

Virgin Mobile Saudi Consortium LLC was formally incorporated in June 2013, shortly after the award of Virgin Mobile’s licence by CITC.

The company is part of Virgin Mobile Middle East & Africa and has local Saudi Arabian companies as shareholders.

Network 
Virgin Mobile uses the STC network for all its Saudi based services. This network operates on the following frequencies: 
 3G 2100 MHz
 4G LTE 1800/2300 MHz
 5G

Products 
Virgin Mobile Saudi Arabia says it focuses mainly on “fairness and simplicity” in its offerings.	

Virgin Mobile’s telecommunications products include:
 Number booking service
 Prepaid plans
 Postpaid plans
 Prepaid mobile broadband services
Virgin Mobile sells their products across Saudi Arabia.

References

External links 
Official website

2013 establishments in Saudi Arabia
Telecommunications companies of Saudi Arabia